The Longest Day is a World War II board wargame published by Avalon Hill in 1980 that simulates the Allied D-Day invasion of June 1944 and the subsequent Normandy campaign.

Background
In early June 1944, Allied forces landed on the beaches of Normandy. Although German forces were not able to eliminate the beachhead, they were able to contain Allied forces within the Contentin Peninsula for almost 8 weeks. The Allies finally broke out with simultaneous attacks by British and Canadian forces (Operation Goodwood) and American forces (Operation Cobra).

Description
The Longest Day is a game for two players (or two teams) that covers the Allied Operation Overlord from the Normandy invasion on June 6, 1944, to the Battle of the Falaise Gap in August 1944. With more than 2600 counters, The Longest Day is a monster game (having more than 1000 counters), and has been characterized as a "complicated simulation" that takes a long time to play.

Components
The large game box weighs nine pounds (4 kg) and contains:
Six 14" x 22" mounted hex grid map boards and one 8"x22" mounted mapboard, scaled at 2 km (1.2 mi) per hex
2603 counters that use German rather than NATO symbols to differentiate infantry, armour, artillery and cavalry
 Reinforcement and unit entry tracks for both sides
Charts for various aspects of the game

Gameplay
The game includes five scenarios that range in playing time from 3 to 12 hours: 
 Normandy Invasion
 Attack on Cherbourg
 Operation Cobra
Mortain Counterattack 
Falaise Pocket

The game uses "Programmed Instruction" to teach the rules: The first scenario uses basic rules, and each succeeding scenario introduces more complexities. Once the five scenarios have been completed, players have learned all of the rules and are ready to play the complete campaign game. 

Each turn represents one day in game time. Wargame Academy rates the game's complexity as 6 on a scale of 10, and estimates a campaign game would take 30–50 hours to complete.

Publication history
The Longest Day was published by Avalon Hill in 1980, with cover art by Rodger B. MacGowan. It was designed by Randall C. Reed, who also designed the counters and maps. Reed was the head of Avalon Hill's research and development staff in the late 1970s, and was one of the first new Avalon Hill employees after the Charles S. Roberts era.  He later left Avalon Hill to work with wargames for the U.S. Marine Corps.

After the game was published, it was discovered that some counters were missing. These were included in The General, Vol. 28, No. 6.

Reception
In Issue 33 of Phoenix, G. Barnard carefully examined the historicity of this game and found it was inaccurate in several areas, including actual units and equipment involved in combat, geographical errors – for example, 9 of 11 British/Canadian landing beaches were incorrectly named – rules that don't accurately represent possible actions, and strategic errors. Despite this litany of mistakes, Barnard concluded, "It is worth playing and, even more so, it is worth studying [...] The game is, I feel, a valuable contribution to the advance of game design, even if just because it sets out to be, or at least seem, historically serious."

Other reviews
 Casus Belli No. 6 (Dec 1981)
Campaign No. 94 & No. 103
Fire & Movement No. 65
The Grenadier No. 13
PanzerFaust No. 63
Richard Berg's Review of Games No. 4 & No. 6

References

External links

The Longest Day at Wargame Academy (wargame)

Avalon Hill games
Board games introduced in 1980
Board wargames with artwork by Rodger B. MacGowan
World War II board wargames